Porseh Su may refer to:
 Porseh Su-ye Olya
 Porseh Su-ye Sofla